Xiangshan may refer to:

Mainland China
Xiangshan County, Guangdong, former county
Xiangshan County, Zhejiang (象山县), a coastal county in Ningbo, Zhejiang
Xiangshan District, Guilin (象山区), in Guilin, Guangxi
Xiangshan District, Huaibei (相山区), in Huaibei, Anhui
Fragrant Hills Park or Xiangshan Park (香山公园), in Haidian District, Beijing
Xiangshan Subdistrict, Beijing, in Haidian District, Beijing
Xiangshan, Zhangjiagang (香山), mountain in Jiangsu
Zhongshan, city in Guangdong whose former name was Xiangshan
Longmen Grottoes, area in Luoyang with a mountain named Xiangshan
Xiangshan, Ma'anshan (向山镇), town in Yushan District, Ma'anshan, Anhui
Xiangshan, Chongren County (相山镇), town in Jiangxi
Xiangshan, Xinjian District (象山镇), town in Xinjian District, Nanchang, Jiangxi
Xiangshan, Sichuan (象山镇), town in Daying County
Xiangshan Subdistrict, Guilin (象山街道), in Xiangshan District, Guilin, Guangxi

Taiwan
Xiangshan, Taipei (象山), mountain and tourist spot in Taipei
Xiangshan District, Hsinchu (香山區), in Hsinchu City
Xiangshan Visitor Center (向山行政暨遊客中心), in Yuchi Township, Nantou County

Others
Lu Jiuyuan (1139–1192), also Lu Xiangshan, twelfth century scholar

See also
Xiangshan station (disambiguation)